Boffzen is a municipality in Holzminden district, Lower Saxony, Germany.

Allocation of seats in the local council electoral period 2001-2006:

 CDU: 4
 SPD: 10
 FDP: 1

Boffzen is also the seat of the Samtgemeinde ("collective municipality") Boffzen.

References

Holzminden (district)